Hannacrois Creek is a  tributary to the Hudson River in the U.S. state of New York. From its source in Westerlo it flows through Dunbar Hollows and over Dickinson Falls to the Alcove Reservoir. It then passes through Coeymans Hollow and just into Greene County to its mouth at the Hudson River in Coeymans, New York.

Variant names of the creek include Hannacroix Creek, Haanadrois Creek, and Hannekraai, among others. The name translates to the Dutch "Rooster crowing".  There is a story that the early Dutch settlers here saw a rooster come floating down the creek on a block of ice, so the creek became known as the Hannekraai, meaning "cock-crowing" creek.  The settlement of Hannacroix also took its name from the creek.

Tributaries
 Silver Creek
 Gulf Creek
 Cole Hollow (stream)

References

Rivers of Albany County, New York
Rivers of New York (state)
Tributaries of the Hudson River